Itanhaém is a municipality in the state of São Paulo in Brazil. It is part of the Metropolitan Region of Baixada Santista. The population is 103,102 (2020 est.) in an area of 601.85 km². The elevation is 4 m.

Location

The name Itanhaém comes from the Tupi word itá-nha'ẽ, meaning the plate of rock. Some other Tupinologists (people who study the ancient language Tupi, spoken by the natives back in the 16th century) believe itanhaém means, ita = rock - and nhaém = that cries; due to the rocky coast and the waves that constantly hit it.

Itanhaém was among the greatest tour destinations in the State of São Paulo, in the late-1970s. Located in the Southeastern Brazil, the region is surrounded by the tropical Atlantic Forest that shelters many tropical animals such as colorful birds named Saíra (many subspecies) and animals such as Onças (Brazilian Jaguars), Quatis and Saruês. Itanhaém has many beaches: Downtown beach (Centro or Boca da Barra), Fishermen's Beach (Praia dos Pescadores); Dream Beach (Praia do Sonho); Indians' Well Beach (Poço dos Índios), Peruíbe Beach (Praia do Peruíbe) and Seagull Beach (Praia da Gaivota).

Other beaches are located in Peruíbe, once part of Itanhaém's territory (20 km southwards) and in the Juréia-Itatins Ecological Station, the best preserved and biggest sanctuary of the Atlantic Forest in Brazil, sheltering endemic species such as the Red-tailed amazon (Brazilian Portuguese: papagaio-de-cara-roxa). Among some of the most popular places in Peruibe, there are the falls of Pereque and Paraiso (Paradise), both forming lakes and waterholes deep enough for a dive among pitus (freshwater shrimp) and lambaris (freshwater fish). The most popular beaches are the ones of Barra do Una (this one on the border of the Municipality of Iguape), Carambore, Desertinha, Juquia, Paranapua, Brava, Guarau and Little Guarau ou Guarauzinho; all of them very close to Itanhaém.

The most important river in the region is located in Itanhaém (Itanhaém River) and its tributary streams such as the Black and the White rivers make sinuous paths into the forest towards the foot of the Serra do Mar where there are many, if not hundreds, of waterfalls. Itanhaém can be reached in 1½ hours by car from the city of São Paulo (130,000 km²), the capital of the State of São Paulo.

The municipality contains part of the Tupiniquins Ecological Station.

The city is served by Antônio Ribeiro Nogueira Jr. Airport

Population history

See also
 Parelheiros-Itanhaém Highway 57
 Roman Catholic Diocese of Santos

References

External links
  Juréia Itatins
  Itanhaém Virtual
  City Hall Official Site
  citybrazil.com.br
  Portal Nosso São Paulo
  Pictures from Itanhaém, City - Beaches - Nature

Populated places established in 1532
Populated coastal places in São Paulo (state)
1532 establishments in the Portuguese Empire
Baixada Santista
Municipalities in São Paulo (state)